
The Naab (Czech: Nába) is a river in Bavaria, Germany, and is a left tributary of the Danube.

The Naab is formed by the confluence of the Waldnaab and the Haidenaab in Luhe-Wildenau, south of Weiden in der Oberpfalz. It flows generally south, through the towns Nabburg, Schwandorf and Burglengenfeld. It flows into the Danube near Regensburg.

See also
List of rivers of Bavaria

References

Sources 
 Die Naab – mit Waldnaab, Fichtelnaab, Haidenaab. (2004) Luftbildband, 132 Seiten, Pustet, Regensburg, 2004. 
 Die Naab – Leben am Fluß im Wandel der Zeit. (1998) Buch & Kunstverlag Oberpfalz, Amberg,´

External links 
 Jura aktiv  Labertal und Naabtal erleben

 
Rivers of Bavaria
Rivers of the Upper Palatine Forest
Rivers of Germany